Michael Thomas Spelman (born 8 December 1950), known as Mick or Mike Spelman, is an English former footballer who played as a midfielder in the Football League for Hartlepool United and Darlington. He was on the books of Wolverhampton Wanderers and Watford, without playing first-team football for either, and also played non-league football for Whitley Bay and Chester-le-Street Garden Farm. As a youngster, he played representative football for England Schools.

References

1950 births
Living people
Footballers from Newcastle upon Tyne
English footballers
Association football midfielders
England schools international footballers
Whitley Bay F.C. players
Wolverhampton Wanderers F.C. players
Watford F.C. players
Hartlepool United F.C. players
Darlington F.C. players
Chester-le-Street Town F.C. players
English Football League players